Purity is a novel by American author Jonathan Franzen. His fifth novel, it was published on 1 September 2015 by Farrar, Straus and Giroux.

The novel is composed of six sections that focus on several different characters and tells the tale of Purity "Pip" Tyler and her quest to discover her biological father, leading her towards Andreas Wolf, a German born hacker based in Bolivia, and Tom Aberant, an editor and journalist based in Denver.

Plot summary
The novel tells the intersecting stories of several different people of widely diverging ages and backgrounds.

Purity in Oakland
Purity Tyler, who goes by the name "Pip" is 23 and has $130,000 in student loan debt. She was raised by her reclusive mother Penelope in Felton, California, south of the Bay Area. The two have a unique and co-dependent relationship with her mother refusing to tell Pip anything about her father or even her previous life including Penelope's real name and age. Pip works as a telemarketer for a company selling dubious green-energy schemes and lives in a communal squat rent-free because of her secret love for a married man named Stephen. After impressing one of the visitors to the squat, a beautiful German anti-nuclear activist, Annagret, she is recruited for The Sunshine Project, a fictional competitor to WikiLeaks, headquartered in Bolivia run by a man named Andreas Wolf. Pip is uninterested in joining the project, but after she makes a romantic advance on Stephen, who rejects her as he thinks of her as a daughter-figure, Pip decides to leave the squat and her job. After asking her mother a final time to help her meet her father so she can try to get him to help with her student loans, Pip decides to go to work for Andreas Wolf, who Annagret has informed her is capable of tracking down her father.

The Republic of Bad Taste
In 1987 Andreas Wolf is 27 and living in East Germany where he acts as a youth councillor for a church, routinely having sex with the teenage girls he councils. When one of the girls refuses to have sex with him in the church he brings her to his estranged parents' dacha where he is caught by local police and told never to return. Andreas falls into bitterness. Sometime later he meets a troubled fifteen-year-old, Annagret who is spending her nights at the church because her step-father has begun sexually abusing her. As her mother is a nurse who is addicted to drugs and has been stealing them and her step-father, Horst, is a low-level Stasi informant, Annagret does not feel that she can report the abuse as one or both of her parents will be imprisoned thus ruining her life. Andreas does not know what to do to protect Annagret and offers to kill Horst. Annagret is initially dismissive of the idea but after a few days changes her mind. Andreas tells Annagret to lure her step-father to his parents' dacha and reminisces about his childhood.

Born to an English literature professor and a high-level official in the East German government, he is indulged as a child due to his intelligence and good looks. However as he grows older he realizes that his life is a facade. His mother suffers bouts of depression and is also sexually promiscuous. When Andreas is a teenager he is sent to a psychiatrist ostensibly due to his excessive masturbation. In reality Andreas is suffering depression after a "ghost" approached him and told him that he was Andreas' actual father, a former graduate student of his mother's with whom she had a long love affair. Andreas continues to act as a perfect child, but when he is twenty he begins to write poetry. When a poem of his is published which contains an obscene and treasonous acrostic he is protected from jail by his parents but warned that he must either complete the army service he has been avoiding or become estranged from them. Andreas chooses estrangement.

Back in 1987 Andreas goes through with killing Annagret's step-father. He is surprised when his crime is not uncovered, but eventually comes to believe his father is protecting him.   
 
Two years later as the Berlin Wall is about to come down and Wolf is afraid his crime will be exposed as the Stasi files are unsealed, Andreas approaches his father and arranges for one last favor with the party. Wolf gets access to his Stasi records and those of Annagret's step-father. While trying to leave with his records he is almost caught before he runs into television cameras and denounces the government, quickly becoming a celebrity dissident, shining "sunlight" on the state's secrets. He then meets an American journalist, Tom Aberant.

Too Much Information
Leila Helou is a fifty-two-year-old investigative journalist for the Denver Independent, an online newspaper. Chasing down a story in Texas, she finds herself missing Pip Tyler, who works as an intern for D.I. and who brought Leila the story. Leila is still married to her now paraplegic husband, a creative writing professor, Charles Blenheim, yet is in a long-term relationship with the D.I. founder and editor Tom Aberant. Enthralled by Pip and thinking of her as the daughter she never had, Leila presses Tom into expanding her role and salary. However as Tom becomes enthralled with Pip himself and offers to let her live with him and Leila, Leila becomes jealous of Pip and begins to think the two are engaged in an emotional affair.

Returning from a work trip, Leila accuses Tom of wanting to leave her for Pip and is shocked when he reveals that he has discovered that Pip's mother is his ex-wife Anabel and he believes he is Pip's father.

Moonglow Dairy
Pip goes to work in Bolivia, which she loves, but is dismayed by the bizarre hierarchy at The Sunshine Project where status is determined by proximity to Andreas Wolf. Andreas pursues Pip sexually, claiming to be falling in love with her and even telling her about the murder of Annagret's step-father Horst, but although they have sexual encounters, Pip refuses to have penetrative sex with him. At the end of six months Andreas tells Pip that it is impossible to track down her father and suggests her skills lie with investigative journalism. He sends her to Denver as Tom is the only other person who knows about Horsts's murder and has Pip install spyware in the D.I. offices and at Tom's home.

Pip comes to genuinely enjoy working at the Denver Independent with Tom and Leila and, realizing they don't seem to have any agenda regarding Wolf, regrets having installed spyware on Tom's computer.  After Andreas tells her he is no longer interested in her sexually she threatens him and asks him to undo the spyware. Shortly after, Tom fires her having located the spyware and realizing that she is an agent sent by Andreas. He interrogates her as to the identity of her father but as she seems to know nothing, he lets her go.

[le1o9n8a0rd]
In the '90s when Tom Aberant is divorced from his wife Anabel Laird he finds himself engaging in sex with her repeatedly. Flashing back to their courtship Tom Aberant remembers when he was a college student at the University of Pennsylvania and editor-in-chief of The Daily Pennsylvanian. Following an unflattering story, an art student at Tyler School of Art, about Anabel Laird, Tom, who is still a virgin, falls in love with the difficult and precocious Anabel. Anabel comes from a wealthy family worth hundreds of millions of dollars but refuses any of the family fortune. Much to Tom's mother's dismay, Tom decides to marry Anabel. Their marriage quickly becomes abusive as Anabel descends into anorexia and isolates Tom from members of his family and his own friends and also does her best to punish him for his journalistic success.

When Tom's mother Clelia reveals she is dying, Tom travels with her to East Germany where she is briefly reunited with the family she abandoned. Tom's mother eventually dies and East Germany crumbles. The day that Andreas appears on television Tom also happens to meet him and is quickly enchanted by him. After Tom reveals that he wants to leave Anabel after eleven years together, Andreas confesses to Horst's murder and persuades Tom to help him remove Horst's body and rebury it at a different location. When they are finished reburying the body, Andreas masturbates on the grave leaving Tom unsettled. He then leaves East Germany without meeting Andreas again.

Tom returns to America where he divorces Anabel, continues having sex with her and finally, to end their relationship tells her he is going to accept a huge check from her father.  She disappears, leaving no trace except for a taunting note. Though Anabel's brothers believe he has killed her he remains on good terms with her father. He does not take money from him while he is alive, but when he dies in 2003, Tom accepts $20,000,000 to fund his own publication.

The Killer
After Tom helps Andreas bury the body, he gets back together with Annagret. She and Wolf's mother Katya become the best of friends, and Wolf finds himself having great internal rages, which he dubs the "killer."

After ten years of lovelessness together, Andreas leaves Annagret after his mother reveals Annagret is in love with another woman. He becomes an internet celebrity and a wanted man in most countries of the world for his leaking of secrets, eventually settling his operations in a hidden paradise within Bolivia. In his growing paranoia, he endlessly searches for information about himself, and when a journalist, Leila Helou, castigates him for "dirty secrets," he connects her with Tom Aberant, who he is convinced has betrayed him. Seeking revenge, he discovers Tom's wife vanished long ago and starts a deep trawl with face-recognition software on American databases. Eventually he discovers Penelope Tyler (Anabel's new name) and learning of Pip's existence and of Tom being her likely father, asks Annagret to recruit Pip.

When Tom finally learns he has been spied on, he comes to Bolivia to have it out with Wolf, who is surprised to learn that Tom has kept his secret. Wolf leads Tom to a high, isolated cliff, taunts Tom with his private knowledge about Pip and his reading of Tom's secret memoir. When he can't goad Tom into killing him, even by telling him he has mailed the secret memoir to Pip, Wolf leaps off the cliff.

The Rain Comes

Pip is trying to come to terms with the knowledge of who she is. She reveals herself to her mother's trust fund manager, whose hands are mostly tied without Anabel's signature at some point. Pip convinces her mother to lend the smallest amounts and arranges for Tom to meet Anabel again. The reunion goes poorly. The novel ends with Pip and her boyfriend Jason sitting in a car outside of Anabel's cabin, listening to a furious argument between Tom and Anabel. Pip has hope that she might be able to do better than her parents.

Characters
 Purity "Pip" Tyler, a young woman from California who has been raised to be codependent with her mother and struggles to escape from her emotionally. Pip sees herself as average in every way but finds herself constantly drawing the attention of other, more powerful people. 
 Andreas Wolf, a German born and raised middle aged man who was raised by his mother as a golden child who could do no wrong and who is selfish and magnetic.
 Leila Helou, a Texas born journalist of Lebanese descent who has spent much of her life with two men, neither of whom has been willing to have a child with her: the selfish Charles Blenheim, a literary has-been, and Tom Aberant, an American journalist and editor.
 Tom Aberant, the American born son of a German mother who is a journalist and editor of the Denver Independent and who is Leila's lover.
 Penelope Tyler, Pip's deceitful mother who lives a small repressed life and who refuses to tell Pip her real name or the name of the man who is Pip's father.
 Annagret, a German anti-nuclear activist and former lover of Andreas Wolf.

Development
The novel had been in development since before December 18, 2012, when Franzen revealed that he had "a four-page, single-spaced proposal" for a fifth novel. A longer excerpt of the novel was published in The New Yorker in June 2015.

On November 17, 2014, The New York Times Artsbeat Blog reported that the novel, titled Purity, would be released in September. Jonathan Galassi, president and publisher of Farrar, Straus and Giroux, described Purity as a multigenerational American epic that spans decades and continents.

Reception
Purity, according to Literary Hub's review aggregator Bookmarks, received a "mixed" response from book critics. The novel garnered high praise from some and negative reviews from others, with Nick Patch stating that the debates centered on Franzen himself. The novelist told Toronto Star, "So people with a lot of time on their hands and no real interest in what is true think I’m a bad person — so what? It’s not going to end my career.” Michiko Kakutani's review in The New York Times was favorable, calling the book "dynamic" and dubbing it Franzen's "most intimate novel yet."  Harper's described the novel's plot as a "beautiful arabesque," and suggests that Franzen seems to have responded to past accusations of anti-feminist chauvinism with blunt clichés.

Darlena Cunha said the novel "only serves to criticize young feminists who use the Internet and dare to stand up to convention. [...] In Purity, Franzen equates masculinity with power, money, logic, and cruel thinking. But when these traits lead his male protagonists down sordid paths, the blame falls on the women — the crazy mothers, the crazy wives, the vulnerable girls." A review of the book in The Economist magazine stated Purity did not compare favorably with his previous works. It stated that the book "feels like an imitation of Mr. Franzen's earlier novels, without the emotional resonance and subtlety."

In a June 2018 profile of Franzen in The New York Times Magazine, Purity was revealed to have been a relative commercial disappointment compared to Franzen's two previous novels. According to the article, Purity has only sold 255,476 copies to date since its release in 2015, compared to 1.15 million copies of Freedom sold since its publication in 2010, and 1.6 million copies of The Corrections sold since its publication in 2001.

Television series
In 2016, Daily Variety reported that the novel was in the process of being adapted into a 20-hour limited series for Showtime by Todd Field who would share writing duties with Franzen and the playwright Sir David Hare. It would star Daniel Craig as Andreas Wolf and be executive produced by Field, Franzen, Craig, Hare & Scott Rudin.

However, in a February 2018 interview with The Times London, Hare said that, given the budget for Field’s adaptation ($170 million),  he doubted it would ever be made, but added “It was one of the richest and most interesting six weeks of my life, sitting in a room with Todd Field, Jonathan Franzen and Daniel Craig bashing out the story. They’re extremely interesting people.”

In June 2018, The New York Times Magazine published a profile of Franzen that reported Franzen receiving a phone call from series writer/director Todd Field to give the news that pre-production on the series had been halted. Star Daniel Craig also called to explain that he had "been summoned" to star in another James Bond movie. It remains unclear whether the series is dead or if a possibility exists for production to resume. In 2017, The Hollywood Reporter quoted Showtime CEO David Nevins as saying that after Craig's commitment to the 25th James Bond movie, the Purity adaptation was still on track. "He's doing Bond first and I can't say anything about what I know or don't know about Bond, [but] It's possible it may not shoot until 2019."

References

2015 American novels
Books with cover art by Rodrigo Corral
English-language novels
Family saga novels
Farrar, Straus and Giroux books
Novels set in Berlin
Novels set in Bolivia
Novels set in Denver
Novels about the Internet
Novels about journalists
Novels by Jonathan Franzen
Novels about dysfunctional families
Nonlinear narrative novels